Armend Qazim Thaqi, also spelled Thaçi, (born 10 October 1992) is a Kosovan professional footballer who plays as a defender for Kosovo Superleague club Ballkani and the Kosovo national team.

Club career

Prishtina
On 22 June 2013, Thaqi signed a three-year contract with Football Superleague of Kosovo club Prishtina.

Gjilani
On 13 July 2016, Thaqi signed a one-year contract with Football Superleague of Kosovo club Gjilani.

Return to Prishtina
On 31 May 2018, Thaqi signed a two-year contract with Football Superleague of Kosovo club Prishtina. His debut with Prishtina came on 11 July in first qualifying round of UEFA Europa League against Luxembourgian side Fola Esch. Thaqi was also named to the Football Superleague of Kosovo Team of the Year in 2018.

Ballkani
On 25 August 2020, Thaqi signed a two-year contract with Football Superleague of Kosovo club Ballkani.

International career

Under-21
In June 2013, Thaqi was named as part of the Kosovo U21 squad for 2013 Valais Youth Cup. On 12 June 2013, he made his debut with Kosovo U21 in 2013 Valais Youth Cup semi-final against Ghana U20 after being named in the starting line-up.

Senior
On 8 November 2017, Thaqi received a call-up from Kosovo for the friendly match against Latvia, and made his debut after coming on as a substitute at 83rd minute in place of Fidan Aliti.

References

External links

1992 births
Living people
Sportspeople from Pristina
Kosovan footballers
Kosovo youth international footballers
Kosovo under-21 international footballers
Kosovo international footballers
Association football defenders
Football Superleague of Kosovo players
KF Hajvalia players
FC Prishtina players
SC Gjilani players
KF Ballkani players